Luteru Tolai (born 1 June 1998 in New Zealand) is a New Zealand rugby union player who plays for the  in Super Rugby. His primary playing position is hooker. He was named in the Blues side in round 5 in 2020. He also plays for the Super Rugby franchise, Moana Pasifika.

Tolai was educated at St Peter's College, Auckland and played rugby for the school.

Reference list

External links
itsrugby.co.uk profile

1998 births
New Zealand rugby union players
Living people
Rugby union hookers
Blues (Super Rugby) players
North Harbour rugby union players
Moana Pasifika players
People educated at St Peter's College, Auckland
Samoan rugby union players
Samoa international rugby union players